A petrostate or oil state is a nation whose economy is heavily dependent on the extraction and export of oil or natural gas. The presence alone of large oil and gas industries does not define a petrostate; countries like Norway, Canada, and the United States are major oil producers but also have diversified economies. Petrostates also have highly concentrated political and economic power, resting in the hands of an elite, as well as unaccountable political institutions which are susceptible to corruption.

Countries considered to be petrostates
While the largest oil-producing states are often petrostates, this is not always true. In 2018, for example, the United States (1st) and Canada (5th) were among the top-five oil producing countries, but are not defined as petrostates due to their diverse economies. Various countries have been identified as current or former petrostates:

Economy
Petrostates are typified by weak economies, where products are more frequently imported than domestically produced. Diversification can successfully occur in limited circumstances, such as Mexico becoming part of the North American Free Trade Agreement, or Dubai leveraging its location to become a hub of commerce and tourism. Most petrostates do not attempt economic diversification, instead seeking economic domination through large, state-owned oil companies.

Governance
Petrostates are often operated by autocratic governments. Petrostate citizens are discouraged from developing autonomy by their dependence on the oil revenue of the government. While a majority of wealthy countries (per capita income more than US $25,000) are democracies, some autocratic petrostates have reached the same level of income due to their massive oil revenues. Petrostates may discourage democratization because wealthy autocrats can buy off their citizens via cheap gas and jobs working in state industries. These oil-based states run by autocrats are sometimes called petro-dictatorships.

Social impacts
The reliance on oil and natural gas may preclude the development of other industries, known as Dutch disease. Light industries, including textiles and clothing, are key factors that drive women to participate in the workforce. Petrostates thus often have lower rates of female workers, which can impede women's access to social and political freedoms.

Resource curse
Global energy prices can cause turbulent and unpredictable swings in a petrostate's economy. Undiversified reliance on oil and gas industries can cause political and economic crises when the price of oil drops. Over-investment in these industries at the expense of other sectors, such as manufacturing and agriculture, can hurt economic growth and competitiveness. Petrostates can suffer from the resource curse, meaning that their abundance of natural resources can have detrimental impacts on other parts of the economy, as well as negative social and political impacts.

References

Authoritarianism
Petroleum politics